River Heights is a city in Cache County, Utah, United States. The population was 1,734 at the 2010 census. It is included in the Logan, Utah-Idaho (partial) Metropolitan Statistical Area.

Geography
According to the United States Census Bureau, the city has a total area of 0.6 square mile (1.5 km2), all land.

Demographics

As of the census of 2000, there were 1,496 people, 477 households, and 390 families residing in the city. The racial makeup of the city was 96.66% White, 0.27% Native American, 0.74% Asian, 1.47% from other races, and 0.87% from two or more races. Hispanic or Latino of any race was 1.94% of the population.

There were 477 households, out of which 42.3% had children under the age of 18 living with them, 72.7% were married couples living together, 6.7% had a female householder with no husband present, and 18.2% were non-families. 16.8% of all households were made up of individuals, and 10.3% had someone living alone who was 65 years of age or older. The average household size was 3.14 and the average family size was 3.54.

In the city, the population was spread out, with 33.1% under the age of 18, 10.0% from 18 to 24, 24.2% from 25 to 44, 18.6% from 45 to 64, and 14.2% who were 65 years of age or older. The median age was 31 years. For every 100 females, there were 90.8 males. For every 100 females age 18 and over, there were 95.1 males.

The median income for a household in the city was $53,750, and the median income for a family was $60,000. Males had a median income of $48,194 versus $25,729 for females. The per capita income for the city was $24,068. About 2.2% of families and 5.2% of the population were below the poverty line, including 7.6% of those under age 18 and 2.9% of those age 65 or over.

Notable people
 Reed C. Durham – Mormon scholar
 Michael Ballam - Director, Utah Festival Opera Company

References

External links

 

Cities in Cache County, Utah
Cities in Utah
Logan metropolitan area
Populated places established in 1882